Bent Burgess (born 18 December 1973) is a Belizean former international footballer. He appeared twice for the Belize national football team in 2000 and 2002, scoring two goals.

Career statistics

International

International goals
Scores and results list Belize's goal tally first.

References

1973 births
Living people
Belizean footballers
Belize international footballers
Association football forwards
Georgetown Ibayani FC players